Fear the Walking Dead is an American post-apocalyptic horror drama television series created by Robert Kirkman and Dave Erickson. It is a companion series to The Walking Dead, which is based on the comic book series of the same name by Robert Kirkman, Tony Moore, and Charlie Adlard. It premiered on the cable network AMC on August 23, 2015.

On December 3, 2020, the series was renewed for a seventh season, which premiered on October 17, 2021.  The series has been renewed for an eighth and final season, which will premiere on May 14, 2023.

Series overview

Episodes

Season 1 (2015)

Season 2 (2016)

Season 3 (2017)

Season 4 (2018)

Season 5 (2019)

Season 6 (2020–21)

Season 7 (2021–22)

Season 8  

The seventh through ninth episodes are written by David Johnson & Calaya Michelle Stallworth, Andrew Chambliss & Ian Goldberg, and Nick Bernardone & Jacob Pinion, respectively.

Webisodes

Fear the Walking Dead: Flight 462 

A 16-part web series, Fear the Walking Dead: Flight 462, was released from October 4, 2015, and March 26, 2016, on AMC.com; it also aired as promos during The Walking Dead season 6. The web series depicts the outbreak's effect on a commercial airplane flight. Two of its characters, Alex (originally called Charlie in the web series), and Jake are introduced in Fear the Walking Dead season 2, episode 3 "Ouroboros".

Fear the Walking Dead: Passage 
A second 16-part web series, was released from October 17, 2016, and March 27, 2017, and episodes were made available online weekly and aired as promos during the seventh season of The Walking Dead. The web series follows Sierra, a capable survivor, who helps an injured woman named Gabi, as they try to find sanctuary. The series was written by Lauren Signorino and Mike Zunic and directed by Andrew Bernstein.

The Althea Tapes 
A six-part web series was released from July 27 to August 8, 2019, on AMC.com and YouTube. The web series features Althea interviewing different survivors for their story.

Dead in the Water 
In March 2021, AMC announced the digital spin-off series Dead in the Water: A Fear the Walking Dead Story, which is set aboard  and "tells the story of a submarine crew fighting for survival, cut off from the surface world just as the apocalypse hits, becoming a nuclear-fueled walker-filled death trap with no way out." The special stars Nick Stahl as Jason Riley and premiered on AMC+ on April 10, 2022.

Ratings

Home media

References

External links 

 
 

List of episodes
Lists of American drama television series episodes
Lists of American horror television series episodes